The 1860 United States presidential election in Alabama took place on November 6, 1860, as part of the 1860 United States presidential election. Alabama voters chose nine representatives, or electors, to the Electoral College, who voted for president and vice president.

Alabama was won by the 14th Vice President of the United States John Breckenridge (SD–Kentucky), running with Senator Joseph Lane, with 54.00% of the popular vote, against Senator John Bell (CU–Tennessee), running with the Governor of Massachusetts Edward Everett, with 30.89% of the popular vote and the 15th Senator Stephen A. Douglas (D–Illinois), running with 41st Governor of Georgia Herschel V. Johnson, with 15.11% of the popular vote.

Republican Party candidate Abraham Lincoln was not on the ballot in the state. It would not participate in the 1864 election, which Lincoln won.

Results

See also
United States presidential elections in Alabama

References

Alabama
1860
1860 Alabama elections